Jelovica ( or ) is a small dispersed settlement below the eastern slopes of Mount Blegoš in the Municipality of Gorenja Vas–Poljane in the Upper Carniola region of Slovenia.

References

External links 

Jelovica on Geopedia

Populated places in the Municipality of Gorenja vas-Poljane